The Penn Plaza East complex takes its name for its location near Penn Station in Newark, New Jersey. Fronting Raymond Boulevard on the banks of the Passaic River, the two office buildings were constructed during a period in the late 1980s  and early 1990s when they and numerous postmodern skyscrapers were built near the station and Gateway Center. While others went up between the station and traditional Downtown Newark, Penn Plaza East is on the Ironbound, or east, side of the major transportation hub. As of 2010, the buildings are occupied by the corporate headquarters of New Jersey Transit, JOC Group, and Horizon Blue Cross Blue Shield of New Jersey, which owns their building.

Originally developed and owned by Hartz Mountain Industries  One building was later bought by Horizon Blue Cross Blue Shield of New Jersey.

The two towers sit above a four-story parking facility and lobby that joins them. An additional parking area in the shadow of the Dock Bridge will be developed as part Newark Riverfront Park a promenade along the banks of the river.

See also

List of tallest buildings in Newark
List of tallest buildings in Jersey City

References

Skyscraper office buildings in Newark, New Jersey
Office buildings completed in 1992
Postmodern architecture in the United States